The discography of American singer Mayer Hawthorne consists of eight studio albums, five EPs, a live album, fifteen singles and seventeen guest appearances.

Studio albums

EPs
A Few Tracks CD (2009, promo)
Impressions – The Covers EP (May 11, 2011) (available for free download)
Fux with the Tux EP –  (Tuxedo EP, 3 tracks are also on Tuxedo II) (Soundcloud)
Party of One EP (October 28, 2016) (Okayplayer)
Rare Changes (2020, 2 track EP, both tracks are on "Rare Changes" Album)

Live albums

Singles

Guest appearances

References 

Discographies of American artists
Hip hop discographies